Vietnam participated in the 2009 Southeast Asian Games in the city of Vientiane, Laos from 9 December 2009 to 18 December 2009. They won 83 gold, 75 silver, and 57 bronze medals. They came second overall in Nation Ranking.

References

2009
Southeast Asian Games
Nations at the 2009 Southeast Asian Games
Southeast Asian Games